Henri Xhonneux (12 June 1945 – 24 March 1995) was a Belgian film director and screenwriter. He directed five films between 1970 and 1989. His 1975 film Souvenir of Gibraltar was entered into the 9th Moscow International Film Festival.

Filmography
 Take Me, I'm Old Enough/Et ma sœur ne pense qu'à ça (1970, as Joseph W. Rental)
 Débauche de majeures (1970)
 Le jeu de quilles (1973 short)
 Cyclocross (1973 short)
 Souvenir of Gibraltar (1975)
 Téléchat (1982-1985 TV series)
 Le penseur (1987-1992 short film series)
 Marquis (1989)
 Topor père et fils (1993 documentary)

References

External links

1945 births
1995 deaths
Belgian film directors
Belgian screenwriters
People from Eupen
20th-century screenwriters